Hornby is a major residential and retail suburb at the western edge of Christchurch, New Zealand. The suburb is directly connected to other parts of Christchurch and the South Island by a number of main arterial routes, including State Highway 1 and the Christchurch Southern Motorway.

History

European settlement

During the early stages of European settlement, Hornby was originally referred to as Southbridge Junction – with the junction acting as the start of the main road south.

Due to rising confusion with the nearby town of Southbridge, a decision was made to rename the area to Hornby in 1878, although the origins of this name are unclear. One explanation holds that the suburb was named after Hornby-with-Farleton in Lancashire by Frederick William Delamain, who came to Christchurch from England in 1852. Delamain owned a nearby homestead, which gave its name to the nearby suburb of Yaldhurst, and was a prominent figure in the area during the latter half of the 19th century. Another version suggests that the name refers to Geoffrey Hornby, who was the Admiral of the British flying squadron and who visited Christchurch in 1870, just prior to the suburb being renamed on 2 September 1878.

Modern history

In 1922, the suburb was chosen by Kempthorne Prosser to be the location for a new super-phosphate plant, used to develop fertiliser. The plant was the company's first in Christchurch and third overall, developed in response to an 1881 incentive from the New Zealand government to facilitate the construction of a local fertiliser industry. This fertiliser plant remains in operation, and is now run by Ravensdown limited, which bought Kempthorne Prosser in 1978. The plant was the location of a large fire in 2018, which prompted nearby evacuations in fear of an explosion and caused thick black smoke to be visible across the region.

Prior to the development of adjacent suburbs such as Wigram, Hornby's isolation from the rest of Christchurch as a result of Wigram Aerodrome and the industrial estates of Sockburn led to it occasionally being considered a town in its own right, however officially it has always been a suburb of Christchurch. Hornby is home to a velodrome and a BMX track. In the past, it has been the location for "Westside Party in the Park", a free Christmas concert.

Demographics
Hornby comprises four statistical areas.

Commercial area

Hornby Central had a population of 135 at the 2018 New Zealand census, an increase of 15 people (12.5%) since the 2013 census, and a decrease of 21 people (-13.5%) since the 2006 census. There were 45 households. There were 75 males and 57 females, giving a sex ratio of 1.32 males per female. The median age was 43.4 years (compared with 37.4 years nationally), with 15 people (11.1%) aged under 15 years, 30 (22.2%) aged 15 to 29, 75 (55.6%) aged 30 to 64, and 12 (8.9%) aged 65 or older.

Ethnicities were 68.9% European/Pākehā, 15.6% Māori, 6.7% Pacific peoples, 17.8% Asian, and 2.2% other ethnicities (totals add to more than 100% since people could identify with multiple ethnicities).

The proportion of people born overseas was 26.7%, compared with 27.1% nationally.

Although some people objected to giving their religion, 51.1% had no religion, 33.3% were Christian and 6.7% had other religions.

Of those at least 15 years old, 12 (10.0%) people had a bachelor or higher degree, and 24 (20.0%) people had no formal qualifications. The median income was $35,000, compared with $31,800 nationally. The employment status of those at least 15 was that 66 (55.0%) people were employed full-time, 15 (12.5%) were part-time, and 12 (10.0%) were unemployed.

Residential Hornby
The residential areas of Hornby, comprising the statistical areas of Hornby West and Hornby South, cover .

The residential areas of Hornby had a population of 6,936 at the 2018 New Zealand census, an increase of 324 people (4.9%) since the 2013 census, and an increase of 633 people (10.0%) since the 2006 census. There were 2,586 households. There were 3,552 males and 3,387 females, giving a sex ratio of 1.05 males per female, with 1,191 people (17.2%) aged under 15 years, 1,608 (23.2%) aged 15 to 29, 3,114 (44.9%) aged 30 to 64, and 1,023 (14.7%) aged 65 or older.

Ethnicities were 69.1% European/Pākehā, 12.9% Māori, 6.0% Pacific peoples, 20.8% Asian, and 2.6% other ethnicities (totals add to more than 100% since people could identify with multiple ethnicities).

The proportion of people born overseas was 26.6%, compared with 27.1% nationally.

Although some people objected to giving their religion, 49.0% had no religion, 36.7% were Christian, 2.6% were Hindu, 1.0% were Muslim, 1.1% were Buddhist and 2.9% had other religions.

Of those at least 15 years old, 711 (12.4%) people had a bachelor or higher degree, and 1,419 (24.7%) people had no formal qualifications. The employment status of those at least 15 was that 3,117 (54.3%) people were employed full-time, 684 (11.9%) were part-time, and 219 (3.8%) were unemployed.

Islington-Hornby Industrial area

Islington-Hornby Industrial had a population of 342 at the 2018 New Zealand census, a decrease of 39 people (-10.2%) since the 2013 census, and a decrease of 75 people (-18.0%) since the 2006 census. There were 135 households. There were 189 males and 153 females, giving a sex ratio of 1.24 males per female. The median age was 50.1 years (compared with 37.4 years nationally), with 30 people (8.8%) aged under 15 years, 60 (17.5%) aged 15 to 29, 192 (56.1%) aged 30 to 64, and 60 (17.5%) aged 65 or older.

Ethnicities were 79.8% European/Pākehā, 11.4% Māori, 7.9% Pacific peoples, 7.9% Asian, and 0.9% other ethnicities (totals add to more than 100% since people could identify with multiple ethnicities).

The proportion of people born overseas was 16.7%, compared with 27.1% nationally.

Although some people objected to giving their religion, 58.8% had no religion, 32.5% were Christian, 0.9% were Muslim, 0.9% were Buddhist and 1.8% had other religions.

Of those at least 15 years old, 21 (6.7%) people had a bachelor or higher degree, and 102 (32.7%) people had no formal qualifications. The median income was $30,800, compared with $31,800 nationally. The employment status of those at least 15 was that 171 (54.8%) people were employed full-time, 33 (10.6%) were part-time, and 9 (2.9%) were unemployed.

Transport

Hornby is located on an important road junction on State Highway 1, where southbound traffic turns sharply west, continuing towards to Dunedin and other points south. Northbound connects to Picton via the Christchurch International Airport. This junction also connects traffic to the nearby suburbs of Sockburn and Riccarton towards the central city, and south to the Christchurch Southern Motorway, which forms part of State Highway 76.

Economy

Retail

Hornby contains two large retail malls, located either side of State Highway 1 to the west of the main junction.

The Hub Hornby opened in 1976. It has a lettable area of 4,000 m². It has more than 800 carparks and 82 tenants, including Pak'nSave and Farmers.

Outlet mall Dress Smart Christchurch opened to the south in 1999. Following an expansion in 2005, it covers 7,117 m², with 53 stores and 347 carparks.

Sport

The Hornby area contains many sports clubs. These include : Hornby Netball Club, Christchurch Junior Cricket Association, Hornby Soccer, Westside Sports Club, Hornby Touch Club, ISL Hornby Women's Football Club,  Burnham Golf Club, Hornby Working Men's Club and Pegasus Cycling Club.

Education
Hornby High School is a secondary school for years 7 to 13 with a roll of  students. The school opened in 1975.

Hornby Primary School and South Hornby School are contributing primary schools catering for years 1 to 6. Hornby Primary opened in 1895.

All these schools are coeducational. Rolls are as of

References

Suburbs of Christchurch